Munna Lal Mundel was a naik (corporal) in the 9th Jat Regiment of the Indian Army with service number 3181886. Originally from the village of Mundwa in the Nagaur district of the Indian state of Rajasthan, he received the Shaurya Chakra award for valour  from the President of India, A. P. J. Abdul Kalam at a ceremony in Rashtrapati Bhavan, New Delhi on April 12, 2005 (Indian national calendar: Chaitra 22, 1927).

Notes

External links
Samachar 16 Sep'04
Tribune India news 15 August 2004
Rediff.com news 15 Aug'2004

Living people
People from Nagaur district
Military personnel from Rajasthan
Recipients of the Shaurya Chakra
Year of birth missing (living people)